Alice (formerly known as Elris), is a South Korean girl group consisting of EJ, Do-A , Chaejeong, Yeonje, Yukyung, Sohee, and Karin. The group orginally debuted as Elris on June 1, 2017, with their first extended play, We, First.

In December 2021, the group was transferred to IOK Company and later re-branding as Alice in April 2022.

History

Pre-debut 
Prior to the group's debut, Kim So-hee and Min Ka-rin were contestants on the reality show K-pop Star 6. Sohee was part of the KWIN unit, which made it to the final episode as the runner-up.

Following the conclusion of K-pop Star 6, on May 19, 2017, Sohee released her first solo digital single "Spotlight".

2017–2020: Debut as Elris and re-formation as seven members 

On June 1, 2017, Elris released their first EP, We, First, containing five tracks including the titular lead single. 

Their second EP, Color Crush, was released on September 13, 2017, consisting of five other tracks and the lead single "Pow Pow".

In late 2017, members Bella and Hyeseong participated in the reality show MIXNINE. Both of them did not make it to the final lineup of the female winners.

On June 6, 2018, Hunus Entertainment confirmed that Elris would be coming back on June 28 with their third EP titled Summer Dream. On June 28, Elris released their third mini-album, containing three tracks, including the titular title song.

On October 18, 2018, Sohee debuted as a soloist, with the digital single "Hurry Up".

Elris released a digital single titled Miss U on November 12, 2019.

On February 12, 2020, Hunus Entertainment confirmed the addition of two new members, EJ and Chaejeong. On February 26, the group released their fourth extended play Jackpot, including a single of the same name. This was their first release as a seven-member group following the addition of two new members and their first proper comeback in nearly two years since their third mini album. Jackpot was also the last release that carried the name ELRIS. The group went on hiatus for most of 2020 and all of 2021.

2021–present: New agency and rebranding
On December 1, 2021, it was announced that Elris would be transferred to IOK Company.

On April 11, 2022, it was announced that the group rebranded to Alice. Members Hyeseong and Bella changed their stage names to Yeonje and Do-A, respectively. Chaejeong was also appointed as the new leader.  They were scheduled to make their comeback in May 3 with the digital single "Power of Love".  However, it was announced that the digital single's release would be delayed to May 4.

On October 4, 2022, it was announced that Alice would comeback with "Dance On" as a single; the song was released on October 27, 2022.

Members
Adapted from their Naver profile.
 EJ
 Do-A
 Chaejeong — Leader
 Yeonje
 Yukyung
 Sohee 
 Karin

Discography

Extended plays

Single albums

Singles

OSTs

Compilation appearances

Concerts and tours

Concert participation

Awards and nominations

References

External links

South Korean girl groups
South Korean dance music groups
Musical groups established in 2017
K-pop music groups
Musical groups from Seoul
2017 establishments in South Korea
South Korean pop music groups
Musical quintets